Qi Yuxi (born 21 November 2000) is a Chinese footballer currently playing as a goalkeeper for Heilongjiang Ice City.

Career statistics

Club
.

Notes

References

2000 births
Living people
Chinese footballers
China youth international footballers
Association football goalkeepers
China League One players
Jiangsu F.C. players
Heilongjiang Ice City F.C. players